Lady Gaga Presents the Monster Ball Tour: At Madison Square Garden is a 2011 concert special which documents the February 21 and 22, 2011 shows of American pop singer Lady Gaga's worldwide concert tour, The Monster Ball Tour. Filmed at Madison Square Garden in Gaga's hometown of New York City, the two-hour special was directed by the singer's choreographer Laurieann Gibson and produced by HBO. It was first broadcast on the channel on May 7, 2011, a day after Gaga's last date of The Monster Ball Tour. The special was released on November 21, 2011, on DVD and Blu-ray by Media Blasters.

Lady Gaga Presents the Monster Ball Tour: At Madison Square Garden features concert footage as well as pre-concert and backstage content. The special received critical acclaim; critics praised Gaga's performance and the onstage theatrics while expressing doubt in Gaga's sincerity during her monologues and in pre-concert scenes. When aired, the special was watched by 1.2 million viewers and was nominated for five awards at the 63rd Primetime Emmy Awards, winning one for Outstanding Picture Editing for a Special (Single or Multi-Camera).

The video album released for the special includes extra footage like a capella performances and a photo gallery. The 5.1 surround sound of the release utilized DTS-HD Master Audio and new technology to provide the viewer an optimum experience of watching the live concert. Emphasis was given on the main music and the vocals sung during the concert, while adjusting them against the screaming and the cheering of the crowd. The release was a commercial success, reaching the top of the music DVD charts in the United States, France and Italy and the top-ten in other nations. It received double Platinum certifications in Australia and France, while in the United Kingdom, it was certified Gold.

Background

The Monster Ball Tour was the second worldwide concert tour by Lady Gaga. Staged in support of her EP The Fame Monster (2009) and comprising a set list of songs from the EP and her debut album The Fame (2008), the tour visited arenas and stadiums from 2009 through 2011. Described as "the first-ever pop electro opera" by Gaga, the tour was announced in October 2009 after an intended joint concert tour with hip-hop artist Kanye West was suddenly canceled. The tour commenced four days after the release of The Fame Monster in November 2009. A revision of the tour occurred after only a few months of performances, due to Gaga's concern that the original version was constructed within a very short span of time. The stage of the original show looked like a frame, comparable to that of a hollowed-out television set. Since The Fame Monster dealt with the paranoias Gaga had faced, the main theme of the original shows became human evolution, while elements of the canceled tour with West were still included in some parts. From 2010 onward, the revamped shows had a New York theme and portrayed a story set in the city, where Gaga and her friends got lost and had to find their way to "the Monster Ball". Both versions of the show were divided into five segments, with the last being the encore. Each of them featured Gaga in new outfits, singing songs related to the concept of the segment, as they were followed by a video interlude.

The tour received general critical acclaim, with critics praising Gaga's singing abilities, the theatricality of the show, and her sense of style and fashion. The Monster Ball was a commercial success, with sold-out shows and demand for tickets prompting organizers to add more dates to the itinerary. It ultimately grossed an estimated $227.4 million ($ million in  dollars) from 200 reported shows and an audience of 2.5 million, becoming one of the highest-grossing tours of all time. At the 2010 Billboard Touring Awards, Gaga won the Breakthrough Performer Award, as well as the Concert Marketing and Promotion Award, the latter being an acknowledgment of her partnership with sponsor Virgin Mobile.

Content

The special opens with a black-and-white introduction with a man running that sees Gaga ordering a cup of coffee from a New York convenience store before being escorted by security into a black SUV, where she reminisces about the many times she had been at the arena to watch other acts perform, and realizes that she will now be performing there herself. After being escorted backstage, she removes her makeup and cries as she discusses feeling like a "loser". She then sings the opening lines of "Marry the Night" while preparing to take the stage. Technicolor footage of the concert (shot on February 21 and 22, 2011) is then seen, interspersed with black-and-white backstage footage. The special ends with another black-and-white backstage scene where Gaga and her backup singers perform "Born This Way" acapella.

Release and reception

Lady Gaga Presents the Monster Ball Tour: At Madison Square Garden was filmed at Madison Square Garden in Gaga's hometown of New York City, the two-hour special was directed by the singer's choreographer Laurieann Gibson and produced by HBO, with the first broadcast on the channel on May 7, 2011, a day after Gaga's last date of The Monster Ball Tour. The channel had released a trailer for the special in YouTube and a poster in their website, which showed Gaga with her characteristic pyrotechnic bra emitting sparks. According to Billboard, the special was watched by 1.2 million viewers. The special received critical acclaim. On review aggregate website Metacritic, the special holds a rating of 81 out of 100 based on four critic reviews, indicating "universal acclaim". Jed Gottlieb of the Boston Herald wrote, "[B]etween the orgy of visuals—stripper strobes, androgynous dancers and a very loose, X-rated 'Wizard of Oz' theme—we get some great song and dance numbers: 'Poker Face', 'Paparazzi' and 'Bad Romance'. These are amazing hits, club-thumping tracks that define joy and sadness for a generation of suburban teens and the urban disenfranchised." However, he felt that the show's non-concert content was not genuine, and found the special to be similar to Madonna's 1991 documentary Madonna: Truth or Dare. The A.V. Clubs Genevieve Koski gave the special a B+ rating, claiming that Gaga "proves that she is a performer" and that "she puts on a show", though she felt that the concert was overly emotional and artistically ambitious, and that Gaga's on-stage banter was slightly annoying. Koski also compared the special to the Madonna documentary. Linda Stassi from New York Post was also positive in her assessment of the concert special. She complimented the behind the scenes footage, the costumes and the dancing and the pyrotechnics of the show, describing it as "a concert that would make Madonna's shows look like run-of-the-mill dinner theater." A review in website Idolator described Gaga as "ringleader of her own circus — in complete control of her little monsters". It went on to appreciate Gaga's vocals and the fact that she did not lip-synch, as well as the hurried costume changes, while commending the "raw" nature of the show.

Paul Schrodt of Slant Magazine was more critical in his review, though he gave it a 2.5 star (out of 4) rating. While he positively called Gaga's performances outrageous and "occasionally fierce", he questioned Gaga's authenticity, both on stage and in the pre-concert scenes. Ultimately, he wrote, "Unsurprisingly, HBO's Lady Gaga Presents the Monster Ball Tour: At Madison Square Garden raises more questions about Stefani Germanotta (Gaga's birth name) than it answers, which is probably as it should be." Radio host Howard Stern also compared the black-and-white scenes of the special to Madonna: Truth or Dare, adding that when he darts a glance at Lady Gaga, she is occasionally registered in his brain as Madonna. On his show, Stern was also critical of inappropriateness and unreasonability of the numerous speeches Gaga gave between the songs in the special, calling them "prattle", "drivel", and "condescending". Dedicating over half an hour of his show on May 9 and 10, 2011, to express his criticism of the concert, Stern compared the manner of Gaga's speaking to professional wrestling due to echoing, Gaga's gasping between the words, and the audience's arguable inability to hear the words enough to understand them. In particular, Gaga claimed in the concert that her incentive to work is to "set [her audience] free", not money. Stern attempted to debunk that claim by arguing that Gaga takes potentially psychiatric problems of her audience lightly by urging her fans to "forget all of [their] insecurities" overnight.

The special received five nominations at the 63rd Primetime Emmy Awards. It was nominated for Outstanding Variety, Music or Comedy Special; Outstanding Directing for a Variety, Music or Comedy Special; Outstanding Technical Direction, Camerawork, Video Control for a Miniseries, Movie or a Special; Outstanding Picture Editing for a Special (Single or Multi-Camera); and Outstanding Lighting Design/Lighting Direction for a Variety, Music or Comedy Special. It won the picture editing award and lost all of its other bids. The five nominations were among the 104 HBO received for 2011; it made up over one-fifth of the total nominations. The special also received a nomination at the 2012 Dorian Awards in the TV Musical Program of the Year category, while winning Best Westen Music Video at the 2013 Japan Gold Disc Awards.

Video album

Development

Lady Gaga Presents the Monster Ball Tour: At Madison Square Garden was released on DVD and Blu-ray on November 21, 2011, and was also released as a digital download to iTunes Store. In addition to the content of the original HBO broadcast, it includes new, previously-unseen footage. The video is also a part of a bundled package—along with the 17-track special edition of Born This Way and a remix album, Born This Way: The Remix—titled Born This Way, The Collection, which was released the same day. Lady Gaga Presents the Monster Ball Tour: At Madison Square Garden was captured with a 14-camera High Definition shoot. The Blu-ray edition of the video album is presented in an aspect ratio of 1.78:1, encoded with MPEG-4 AVC and grants a 1080i transfer. It contains two audio tracks DTS-HD Master Audio 5.1 and LPCM 2.0. According to Jim Belcher, Vice President for Advanced Technology and Production of Universal Music Group, the advanced technologies associated with Dolby DTS-HD would allow the audience the best experience while viewing the DVD.

Brian Riordan, one of the engineers who worked on mastering the audio for the DVD described in a video interview with Rolling Stone how the mix was achieved. He recalled getting a call from one of the show's producers who were looking for specialized sound arrangements to acquire an authentic live concert feeling for the release. Riordan remembered that the main difficulty was trying to preserve the "craziness" of the audience and Gaga's fans, and their screaming during the concert, nevertheless make the music of the show primary. His team used Lossy which did not use compression, instead one-to-one audio mixing giving the whole sound system "much more of an impactful experience". Riordan decided to engineer the concert sound as "center-channeled" since Gaga did not use backing audio, resulting in the listener getting the whole impact of her vocals, when listened with a headphone. Other difficulty faced by team included converting the heavy production of Gaga's songs to a live format and utilizing the singer's bands. "You also have the crowd, the house  going nuts and all the reverberations at Madison Square Garden, so it was really difficult for me to figure out globally how real, how dry, how punchy can we get this thing to sound", he added. Initially Riordan had featured more of the live instrumentation and mixed the songs a number of times, however felt that they needed a dry reverb hence he pondered on the mix along with co-producer coming to a consensus regarding the sound. According to Riordan, the mixing process was approved by Gaga who watched the cuts while travelling on the tour however, she did not ask Riordan to change anything, unlike previous projects the engineer had undertaken. The 5.1 mix was further orchestrated by using the sound recordings from the microphones placed around the audience members in Madison Square Garden, giving a new dimension to the surround sound in the Blu-ray.

It has a length of over 114 minutes and contains five subtitles: English, French, Spanish, Portuguese and German. Extra features added to the release included another a cappella version of "Born This Way" which was performed on stage unlike the one in the closing credits. A photo gallery was also included as well as backstage footage showing Gaga meeting with actress Liza Minnelli. According to Jeffrey Kauffman of Blu-ray.com, the audio tracks were commendable for their crisp sound. He stated that "One of the best things about this concert is despite its artifice, even its artificiality, there's absolutely no question that Lady Gaga is actually singing. What a novel idea for a live concert, and one that seemed especially refreshing after having just sat through the Britney Spears Live: The Femme Fatale Tour concert Blu-ray, where Brit's live voice was all but buried in the pre-records."

Chart performance
In the United States, it entered Billboards Top Music Video chart at the top, selling 26,000 copies of the DVD—the greatest total for a music video since Beyoncé' I Am... World Tour live CD/DVD sold 37,000 and 31,000 copies in its first two weeks in November and December 2010, and held this title until the release of Adele's Live at the Royal Albert Hall. Its final appearance on the chart was for the issue dated November 30, 2013, where upon it tallied a total of 64 weeks inside the chart. Lady Gaga Presents the Monster Ball Tour: At Madison Square Garden became the fourth best-selling music video of 2011 in the United States.

In Australia, the DVD debuted at number two on the ARIA DVD Chart. The next week, it remained in the same position, while being certified platinum by the Australian Recording Industry Association (ARIA) for shipment of 15,000 copies of the DVD. Lady Gaga Presents the Monster Ball Tour: At Madison Square Garden was certified double platinum in January 2012, denoting shipments of 30,000 copies. It was the fifth and eleventh best selling DVD of 2011 and 2012 in Australia, respectively. The DVD charted on the UK Music Video chart at number four, for the issue dated December 3, 2011. It was certified gold by the British Phonographic Industry (BPI) for selling more than 25,000 copies. Across Europe, the DVD reached the top of the charts in France and Italy, the former region it was also certified double platinum by the Syndicat National de l'Édition Phonographique (SNEP) for shipment of 30,000 copies of the release. It reached the top-ten of the charts in other nations.

Track listing

Bonus content
"Born This Way" (a cappella) – 3:16
"Backstage at the Monster Ball" – 12:50
Photo gallery
 Track listing adapted from Amazon.com.

Weekly charts

Year-end charts

Certifications

Credits and personnel
Credits adapted from Lady Gaga Presents the Monster Ball Tour: At Madison Square Garden DVD booklet.

Main personnel

Laurieann Gibson – director
Troy Carter  – executive producer  
Nicole Ehrlich  – creative producer  
Lady Gaga – executive producer  
Vincent Herbert  – executive producer  
Jimmy Iovine  – executive producer  
Steven Johnson  – co-producer  
Mark Leed  – associate producer  
Mo Morrison  – executive producer 

Production crew 

Bill DeRonde – film editing   
Michael Polito – film editing      
Leroy Bennett  – production design 
Peter Aquinde – art direction
Production Management Jason Danter  – production manager  
Clarence Fuller  – production manager  
Susan Kopensky  – production supervisor  
Jennifer Krobot  – assistant production manager  
Mo Morrison  – production executive  
Dave Oberg  – post-production supervisor  
Rob Paine  – executive in charge of production  
Karen Scarminach  – production manager  
Michael Polito  – associate director  
Sandra Restrepo  – associate director (as Sandra Restrepo Considine)  
Art Department Lonnie Adams  – carpenter  
Dave Cockrell  – carpenter  
Kia Crawford  – props  
Dan Gurchik  – carpenter  
Bob Hood  – carpenter  
Brandon Kennedy  – props  
Chris Organ  – carpenter  
Wayne Pina  – carpenter  
Bobby Reid  – carpenter  
Eddie Rodriguez  – carpenter  
Norm Sigal  – carpenter  
Kenneth Walter  – head carpenter (as Kenneth 'Scotty' Walter)

Costumes and makeup   

Rachel Barret – costume designer
Alun Davies – costume designer   
Keko Hainswheeler – costume designer   
Charlie Le Mindu – costume designer   
Armani Prive – costume designer   
Philip Treacy – costume designer   
Zaldy – costume designer   
Frederic Aspiras  – hair stylist (as Frederic Aspiras)  
Deborah Lippman  – manicurist  
Brandon Maxwell  – stylist  
Tara Savelo – makeup  
Sarah Tanno  – makeup artist  
Marissa Willinsky  – makeup artist  

Sound Department 

James Allen  – sound technician: pa  
Wayne Bacon  – sound technician: pa  
Charlie Campbell  – audio assistant  
Timothy Cleary  – sound recordist (as Tim Cleary)  
Phil DeTolve  – post audio assist  
Bill Flugan  – rf/pl technician  
Michael A. Fortunato  – audio assistant  
Jim Goldsmith  – audio assistant (as Jimmy Goldsmith)  
Gabriel Heredia  – sound designer  
Skip Kent  – audio assistant  
Brian Kingman  – audio assistant  
Don Klocker  – sound crew chief  
James LaMarca  – sound technician: pa  
Adrian Martinez  – boom operator  
Ramon Morales  – monitor engineer  
Brian Riordan  – sound re-recording mixer  
Pete Smalls  – sound designer  
Kevin Szafraniec  – sound technician: pa  
Horace Ward  – f.o.h. engineer  
Barry S. Weir Jr.  – mix assist / post audio assist  

Special Effects 

Rob Liscio  – pyro technician (as Robert Liscio)  
Raymond Seymour  – pyro technician (as Ray Seymour)  
Boyd Stepan  – special effects  
Visual Effects by George Loucas  – visual effects supervisor: Baked FX  
Pierce Varous  – digital imaging technician  
Camera and Electrical Department Lauren Ackert  – electrician (as Laura Ackert)  
Jeff Adkisson  – rigger  
Stuart Allen  – supertechnocrane technician (as Stewart Allen)  
Lenyn Barahona  – head rigger  
Matt Bass  – second unit director of photography 

Lighting crew 

Tom Beck  – lighting director  
Leroy Bennett  – lighting designer (as Le Roy Bennett)  
Larry Blanchette  – best boy grip  
Marina Blanchette  – grip  
Matt Boles  – gaffer  
Matt Bright  – lighting technician  
Billy Broker  – supertechnocrane technician  
Kevin Chung  – camera operator  
Bob DelRusso  – camera operator (as Robert Del Russo)  
Dan Denitto  – techno jib tech  
Ian Dobson  – chief lighting technician  
Adam Dragosin  – video crew chief  
Suzanne Ebner  – camera operator  
Douglas Eder  – lighting technician  
Dave Evans  – lighting technician  
Steve Fatone  – video director: screens  
George Feldbauer  – grip  
Cory FitzGerald  – lighting board operator (as Corey Fitzgerald)  
Meg Flanagan  – lighting technician  

Principal photography

Freddy Frederick  – camera operator  
Rob Gardner  – lighting crew chief  
Matt Geneczko  – lighting technician  
Pat Gleason  – camera operator  
Scott Grund  – camera operator  
Stephen Halouvas  – lighting technician  
Jason Harvey  – video engineer  
Helene Haviland  – camera operator  
Lowell Hawley  – lighting technician  
Greg Hoffman  – key grip  
Alvah Holmes  – assistant camera  
Carl Horahan  – lighting technician  
David Hunkins  – gaffer (as Dave Hunkins)

References

External links
 
 

2011 live albums
2011 television specials
2011 video albums
Albums recorded at Madison Square Garden
HBO network specials
Interscope Records live albums
Interscope Records video albums
Lady Gaga live albums
Lady Gaga video albums
Live video albums
Media Blasters